Helicópteros de Guatemala (HdG) is an airline based in Guatemala City which commenced operations on July 20, 1971. The airline was founded by Héctor Simón Morataya Morales and has a licence to fly within Guatemala, Mexico and Central America.

Services
The airline provides charter services covering diverse missions.

Helicópteros de Guatemala has been appointed AgustaWestland's independent sales representative for Guatemala.

Fleet
HdG operates five helicopters:
 1 Eurocopter AS350 B-3
 1 Bell 206 (JETRANGER) 
 3 Bell 206 L-1 (LONGRANGER III)

References

External links
 Helicópteros de Guatemala
 Air Charter Guide

Airlines of Guatemala
Helicopter airlines
Airlines established in 1971
Guatemalan companies established in 1971